Jennifer Lynn Brundage (born June 27, 1973) is an American, former collegiate All-American softball player and current assistant head coach for Michigan. She played college softball for the UCLA Bruins from 1992 to 1995 and won the 1992 Women's College World Series championship. Brundage was named Honda Sports Award for softball as Player of the Year in 1995. As a part of Team USA softball, she won a gold medal at the 2000 Sydney Olympics.

Career
She competed at the 2000 Summer Olympics in Sydney where she received a gold medal as a member of the American winning team.

Brundage was a four-year letter receiver in softball at UCLA. She won the Honda Sports Award as the nation's top softball player in 1995. She began her college softball career as assistant coach at UCLA Bruins, then was an assistant coach at the University of Tennessee, Chattanooga before joining the University of Michigan coaching staff in 1998.

Coaching career
Brundage helped lead the 2005 Michigan Wolverines softball team to their first Women's College World Series in 2005 as an assistant coach and pitching coach.

Statistics

References

External links
 
 
 

1973 births
Living people
Softball players from California
Medalists at the 2000 Summer Olympics
Michigan Wolverines softball coaches
Olympic gold medalists for the United States in softball
Olympic softball players of the United States
Softball players at the 2000 Summer Olympics
UCLA Bruins softball players
UCLA Bruins softball coaches
Sportspeople from Orange, California
Softball coaches from California
Chattanooga Mocs softball coaches